Joseph Esso (born 10 December 1996) is a Ghanaian football striker for plays for MC Alger in the Algerian Ligue Professionnelle 1. and Ghana National Team.

He previously played for Ebusua Dwarfs, Accra Hearts of Oak. and Dreams F.C. He is the brother of Ghanaian footballer, Eric Esso.

Club career 
Esso played for Ebusua Dwarfs from 2016 to 2018 before signing for Accra Hearts of Oak in 2018. He made 25 appearances and scored 9 goals in the 2017 Ghanaian Premier League season to help the club finish fourth.

Accra Hearts of Oak 
In 2018, after his contract expired, Esso joined Accra Hearts of Oak on a free transfer signing a 3-year contract with the club. He played for Hearts for three seasons making 42 league appearances and scoring 11 goals.

Dreams FC 
In 2020, Esso refused to extend his contract with Hearts after it expired. He was linked with a move to Sudanese club Al-Hilal. In August 2018, he signed a two-year deal with Dreams FC.

International career 
Esso featured for Ghana A' national football team, the Local Black Stars at the 2019 WAFU Cup of Nations scoring two goals to help Ghana place runner-up in the competition. He was named in the competition's team of the tournament and recognized as one top performers during the competition.

Personal life 
Esso is the younger brother of fellow professional footballer Eric Esso.

References

External links 

 
   

1996 births
Living people
Ghanaian footballers
Ghana international footballers
Ebusua Dwarfs players
Accra Hearts of Oak S.C. players
Association football midfielders
Dreams F.C. (Ghana) players
Algerian Ligue Professionnelle 1 players
Ghana Premier League players
Expatriate footballers in Algeria
MC Alger players
Ghanaian expatriate sportspeople in Algeria
Ghanaian expatriate footballers